Bermuda competed at the 2019 Pan American Games in Lima, Peru from July 26 to August 11, 2019.

In March 2019, the Bermuda Olympic Association announced Branwen Smith-King as the team's chef de mission. In July 2019, the Bermuda Olympic Association named a team of 17 athletes (ten men and seven women) competing in seven sports.

During the opening ceremony of the games, sailor Cecilia Wollmann carried the flag of the country as part of the parade of nations.

Competitors
The following is the list of number of competitors (per gender) participating at the games per sport/discipline.

Athletics (track and field)

Bermuda qualified two male athletes.

Key
Note–Ranks given for track events are for the entire round

Men
Track events

Field event

Bowling

Bermuda qualified two women by finishing among the top five at the PABCON Champion of Champions. Bermuda later qualified two men by finishing in the top qualification position at the 2019 PABCON Male Championships in Lima, Peru.

Cycling

Bermuda qualified two female cyclists.

Road
Women

Sailing

Bermuda qualified a boat in the mixed Nacra 17 event and received a universality spot in the men's laser event.

Squash

Bermuda qualified a men's team of three athletes. This will mark the sport debut at the Pan American Games for Bermuda.

Men
Singles and Doubles 

Team

Swimming

Bermuda qualified two swimmers (one man and one woman).

Triathlon

Bermuda qualified one female triathlete. Originally Flora Duffy and Tyler Smith qualified, but both withdrew from the team.

Women

Non-competing sports

Rowing

Bermuda qualified one woman at the qualification tournament held in December 2018 in Rio de Janeiro, Brazil. Shelly Pearson finished fourth at the qualification tournament to qualify. Pearson later withdrew due to losing the passion she had for the sport and work commitments.

See also
Bermuda at the 2020 Summer Olympics

References

Nations at the 2019 Pan American Games
2019
2019 in Bermudian sport